Vasile Ghindaru (born 9 May 1978) is a Romanian former footballer who played as a midfielder. Born in Braşov, Ghindaru started his career at FC Brașov, but also played for other teams in the Braşov zone such as: Victoria Bod, Tractorul Brașov or FC Ghimbav. In the Liga I, besides FC Brașov, he played for Astra Ploiești and Petrolul Ploiești. On the end of his career Ghindaru left for Singapore in 2010, where he played for Geylang United.

References

External links
 
 
 

1978 births
Living people
Romanian footballers
Association football midfielders
Liga I players
FC Brașov (1936) players
FC Astra Giurgiu players
FC Petrolul Ploiești players
Liga II players
FC Universitatea Cluj players
CS Concordia Chiajna players
FC Politehnica Iași (2010) players
Singapore Premier League players
Geylang International FC players
Romanian expatriate footballers
Romanian expatriate sportspeople in Singapore
Expatriate footballers in Singapore